Joseph Eastburn Winner (1837–1918) was an American composer and music publisher.  He is best known for his tune, "The Little Brown Jug" (1869).

He was born in Philadelphia, Pennsylvania where he operated a publishing business from 1854 to 1907. He sometimes used the pseudonym R. A. Eastburn on his compositions. From 1845 to 1854 he partnered with his brother, the composer Septimus Winner, in the music publishing business.

References

External links
 
 
 Philadelphia Composers and Music Publishers: Joseph Eastburn Winner (1837-1918)
 Little Brown Jug at Allmusic.com

American male composers
American composers
1837 births
1918 deaths
Songwriters from Pennsylvania
American male songwriters